Ezhupunna is a village in the taluk of Cherthala in Alappuzha district in the Indian state of Kerala. It lies between Alappuzha and Kochi, near National Highway 66.  There is also a railway station, where only passenger trains halt. This is a panchayat which come under the Aroor Assembly constituency and the Alappuzha Parliamentary constituency. The village have borders with Kumbalangy and Chellanam, suburbs of the city of Kochi.

Location

Economy
Prawn farming, pokkali rice cultivation and coconut plantation are means of livelihood. A good number of people have white collar jobs mainly in Kochi.

Companies/Factories/Warehouses
 Accelerated Freeze Drying Company (AFDC).
 Amalgam Nutrients and Feeds Ltd.
 Innovative Foods Ltd.
 Snowman Frozen Foods Ltd.

Schools
The first high school in Ezhupunna, St Raphel's High School. Ezhupunna.  
One of the main schools in the village is Nair Samajam Lower Primary School, St Mary's L.P school near Vadakakath Church, Ezhupunna North and Amala Public School.

Demographics
 India census, Ezhupunna had a population of 27206 with 13214 males and 13992 females.

References

Villages in Alappuzha district